FC Suðuroy is a Faroese football club which was founded in January 2010 and consists currently of the former clubs VB (founded in 1905) and Sumba (founded in 1949), which merged in 2005 to form VB/Sumba. FC Suðuroy's first team in the men's championship competes in the 1. deild in 2021. All teams play their home games at the á Eiðinum Stadium in Vágur. The club logo was designed by the photographer Rógvi Nolsøe Johansen in 2010, the same year he won the competition to design a logo for the club.

History
VB/Sumba played in 1. deild (1. division, which is the second tier) in 2009 and won the division. FC Suðuroy therefore played their first season in the Faroe Islands Premier League, which was called Vodafonedeildin from 2009 to 2011. FC Suðuroy played their first league match on 1 April 2010 against the champions HB Tórshavn. The result was 4–4. FC Suðuroy didn't make it in Vodafonedeildin, they were relegated and played in 1. deild in 2011. They won the division with 70 points and were promoted to Effodeildin along with TB Tvøroyri, which is a club from the same island, Suðuroy.

After the end of the 2016 season it was decided on 15 December 2016 that the three clubs of the island Suðuroy, which are TB Tvøroyri, FC Suðuroy and Royn Hvalba would join together for the 2017 season for the men's teams. They played as TB/FC Suðuroy/Royn. The three clubs continued separately for the children's and women's teams. In 2017 and 2018 it was only the men's teams which were playing for the new cooperation. In Faroese the team was referred to as Suðuroyarliðið or Suðringar (the Suðuroy-team). The first head coach for the Suðuroy-team was Glen Ståhl.

The cooperation ended after the 2018 season. FC Suðuroy played in the 2 division for two seasons. At the end of the 2020 season they won promotion to the 1. deild, the second best division.

Honours
1. deild: 1
 2011.

Current squad

As of 24 December 2020

Notable former players for VB Vágur, Sumba/VB, and VB/Sumba
Players who have played for national teams or for fully pro clubs.

 Jóannes Jakobsen
 Bjarni Johansen
 Jan Allan Müller
 Rúni Nolsøe
 Jón Pauli Olsen
 Símun Samuelsen
 Pól Thorsteinsson
 Heini Vatnsdal
 Obi Ikechukwu Charles
 Krzysztof Popczyński
 Milan Milanović
 Saša Kolman
 Stanislav Kuzma

Managers of FC Suðuroy
 Jón Pauli Olsen (2010–11)
 Pól F. Joensen (2011 – May 22, 2012)
 Tórður Wiberg Holm,  Bogi Mortensen and  Egill Steinþórsson (interim) (May 22, 2012 – May 29, 2012)
 Saša Kolman (May 29, 2012 – Oct 31, 2012)
 Jón Johannesen (13 Nov 2012– 22 July 2014)
 Jón Pauli Olsen (1 August 2014)
 Sigfríður Clementsen (2018)
 Palli Augustinussen (2019 – )

Chairmen of FC Suðuroy
 Bjarni Johansen (2010–11)
 Julius Vest Joensen (2011–)

See also
List of football clubs in the Faroe Islands

References

 Sportal.fo (Faroese) Article about the new goal keeper from Slovenia.
 Kringvarp.fo (Faroese) VB/Sumba becomes FC Suðuroy.
 Kringvarp.fo (Faroese) Article about the new logo.
 Kringvarp.fo (Faroese) Article about FC Suðuroy, the goal keeper, Bjarni Johansen and Pól Thorsteinsson.
 Kringvarp.fo (Faroese) Article about FC Suðuroy and how they will manage in Vodafonedeildin.
 Kringvarp.fo (Faroese) Article about the manager Jón Pauli Olsen.
 Sudurras.com (Faroese) Article about new foreign football players to FC Suðuroy.
 vflnet.com Logo of FC Suðuroy
 Dimmalætting, Fótfimi from March 19, 2010.
 Soccerandequipment.com"FC Suðuroy – formerly VB/Sumba".

External links
 FC Suðuroy's official website.
 Faroese Football Association's Website
 FC Suðuroy on Facebook.
 Visitsuduroy.fo , Tourist Information about Suðuroy.
 Vesturi á Eiðinum, Nordic Stadiums

Football clubs in the Faroe Islands
Association football clubs established in 2010
2010 establishments in the Faroe Islands
Sport in Vágur